Food Network Star Kids is an American cooking competition television series that aired on Food Network, presented by actress Tia Mowry and food critic Donal Skehan. The series is a spin-off of Food Network Star.

Contestants

Winner
 Amber Kelley – Seattle, Washington

Runners-up

 Isaiah Hooks – Stroudsburg, Pennsylvania
 Liam Waldman – Los Angeles, California

Eliminated

 Nicholas Hornbostel – Vail, Colorado
 Sydnie Jaye Meyers – Austin, Texas
 Gracie Evans – Tampa, Florida
 Sammy Voit – The Bronx, New York
 Salvatore "Sal" Soldo – Staten Island, New York
 Tyra Jefferson – Irmo, South Carolina
 Alexa "Lexi" Shuster – Port Chester, New York

Contestant progress 

 (WINNER) The contestant won Food Network Star Kids.
 (RUNNER-UP) The contestant made it to the finale, but did not win.
 (WIN) The contestant won the challenge for that week.
 (HIGH) The contestant was one of the judges' favorites in the challenge for that week.
 (IN) The contestant performed sufficiently well to advance to the next week. 
 (LOW) The contestant was one of the judges' least favorites for that week, but advanced.
 (OUT) The contestant was eliminated from the competition.

Episodes

References

External links
 
 

2010s American cooking television series
2016 American television series debuts
2016 American television series endings
American television spin-offs
English-language television shows
Food Network original programming
Food Network Star
Reality television spin-offs
Television series about children
Television series about teenagers
Television series by Levity Live